The Aldrich Mountains Group is a geologic group in Oregon. It preserves fossils dating back to the Triassic period.

See also

List of fossiliferous stratigraphic units in Oregon
Paleontology in Oregon

References

Geologic groups of Oregon
Triassic System of North America